Harbin Nangang Christian Church is a Protestant (formerly Lutheran) church in Harbin, Heilongjiang Province, China. The current building was built in 1916 and is located in Church Street, along East Dazhi Avenue, northeast of Hongbo Square. Its address is: No. 252, East Dazhi Avenue, Nangang District, Harbin. The church is next to the Eastern Orthodox Church of the Intercession and is almost identical in color to the Orthodox church beside it, with the same red walls and green roofs.

Brief history
 1901 - As the construction of the Chinese Eastern Railway started, some Germans came to Harbin, for whom a Baptist church was built nearby, which was the first Protestant church in Harbin
 1914 - A Lutheran church was built
 1916 - The Lutheran church was re-built and known as Ni-ai-la-yi Church 
 1967 - Closed during the Cultural Revolution
 1980 - Re-opened for worship

Activities
The Nangang Christian Church holds a Chinese-language service and as of 2002, an ethnic Korean service. As of 2017, the church hosts an English fellowship with a mixed congregation of Chinese nationals and overseas citizens. The Sunday morning English service is held from 10:20 - 11:30 AM.

See also
 Dalian Lutheran Church
 Holy Cross Church, Wanzhou
 Lutheran Church of China

Footnotes

External links
 English Group of Harbin Nangang Christian Church
 The First Class Protected Buildings of Harbin (in Chinese) 

Churches in Harbin
Lutheran churches in Asia
Lutheranism in China
Protestant churches in China